Ben Dunne (born 11 March 1949) is an Irish businessman. Former director of his family firm, Dunnes Stores, one of the largest chains of department stores in Ireland, he now owns a chain of fitness centres established by his company Barkisland Developments Limited.

Biography
Ben Dunne was born in Cork on 3 March 1949 to Nora Maloney and Ben Dunne, a business man who founded Dunnes Stores. He was the last of six children.

In 1981, Dunne was kidnapped by the IRA and held for seven days. He was released unharmed after his friend and fellow businessman, Patrick Gallagher, paid his £1 million ransom.

In 1992, Dunne was arrested for cocaine possession and soliciting while on a golf holiday in Florida, USA. His arrest triggered the end of his leadership of Dunnes Stores, as family turmoil led to control falling to his sister Margaret Heffernan and the company paying IR£100 million for Ben Dunne's share of the business.

Dunne was again embroiled in scandal in the mid-1990s when it emerged he had given large amounts of money to a number of Irish politicians, mainly from the Fianna Fáil party including the then Taoiseach, Charles Haughey. He also gave money to Michael Lowry of Fine Gael. Mr Justice Brian McCracken, sole member of The McCracken Tribunal which was established by the Irish Government in 1997, found that Dunne knowingly assisted Lowry in evading his tax obligations. On 22 March 2011, the Moriarty Tribunal concluded of Ben Dunne's dealings with Michael Lowry that  "What was contemplated and attempted on the part of Mr Dunne and Mr Lowry was profoundly corrupt to a degree that was nothing short of breathtaking": the report referring to its finding Lowry sought to influence a rent review of a building part-owned by Dunne.

Dunne now owns a chain of fitness centres called Ben Dunne Gyms located in Dublin and Liverpool, which he personally promotes on radio, using recent Irish advertising legislation which allows direct comparisons to named competitors. Dunne was working on a new health club, to open in Dún Laoghaire in Dublin, but abandoned the project due to complaints from local residents.

In April 2005, Dunne paid £3,000,000 for a  site in Motspur Park, New Malden (South London), former home of BBC Football Club and other BBC sports facilities. His intent was to apply for planning permission to build a leisure and fitness centre, but he did not do so. Instead, in February 2008, his company Barkisland Developments Limited submitted a planning application to the Royal Borough of Kingston upon Thames Council for change of use of the sports ground to a cemetery. The application to change the former BBC Sports Ground into a cemetery was withdrawn on 3 October 2008. It had become clear that planning permission was likely to be refused. Objections were lodged by many local residents, sports clubs, Sport England and the Mayor of London.

In 2009, Dunne established a buy-and-sell website, BenDunne.com, to rival the Buy and Sell, Done Deal and Adverts.ie. Following its soft opening, the new website was affected by glitches and was unable to handle sufficient traffic without going down. Its official launch was cancelled and the website was taken offline to address the problems. It was relaunched in 2010 but failed within a year. Dunne admitted that "The internet is one of my failures. I can't work it out. I can't get people to advertise on BenDunne.com for nothing and I can't get them to pay €3."

References

1949 births
Living people
Businesspeople from County Cork
People educated at Presentation Brothers College, Cork